Dith Munty (born November 15, 1941) is Cambodian politician who is the current Chief Justice of the Supreme Court of Cambodia. He was appointed by the Supreme Council of the Magistracy and has served in the position since 1998. He is a member of the Cambodian People's Party Permanent Committee.

References
 

1941 births
Living people